
Gądkowice  is a village in the administrative district of Gmina Milicz, within Milicz County, Lower Silesian Voivodeship, in south-western Poland. 
In 1793 it was, a German-speaking village, annexed by Prussia. Following population shifts after 1945, it became a Polish-settled village.

The village has a population of 450.

References

Villages in Milicz County